Steven Michael Wellner (born January 20, 1959) is an associate judge of the Superior Court of the District of Columbia.

Education and career 
Wellner earned his Bachelor of Arts from University of Virginia, in 1981, and Juris Doctor from the University of Michigan Law School in 1985.

Wellner worked in the Washington, D.C. office of Kirkland & Ellis, where he was a partner.

D.C. superior court 
President Barack Obama nominated Wellner on November 21, 2013, to a 15-year term as an associate judge on the Superior Court of the District of Columbia. On March 24, 2014, the Senate Committee on Homeland Security and Governmental Affairs held a hearing on his nomination. His nomination expired on January 3, 2015, with the end of the 113th United States Congress.

On April 30, 2015, President Obama renominated Wellner to the same court to the seat vacated by Judge Kaye K. Christian. On June 24, 2015, the committee reported his nomination favorably to the senate floor. On November 19, 2015, the Senate confirmed his nomination by voice vote. He was sworn in on February 19, 2016.

Personal life
Born in Madison, Wisconsin, Wellner grew up outside Baltimore, Maryland. He currently lives in Washington, D.C. with his wife Amy Saltzman. They have two children.

References

1959 births
Living people
20th-century American lawyers
21st-century American judges
Judges of the Superior Court of the District of Columbia
People associated with Kirkland & Ellis
Lawyers from Madison, Wisconsin
University of Michigan Law School alumni
University of Virginia alumni